Earl Theodore Shinhoster (July 5, 1950 – June 11, 2000) was a Black civil rights activist in Savannah, Georgia.

Shinhoster was born in Savannah in 1950 to Nadine and Willie Shinhoster, he was an alumnus of Morehouse College and Cleveland State University.  As a teenager, he was involved in the Civil Rights Movement. In 1994–95, he served as interim executive director of the National Association for the Advancement of Colored People (NAACP).

Shinhoster died near Montgomery, Alabama, in a car collision in 2000.

In 2001 the Georgia Legislature passed a resolution to designate the Earl T. Shinhoster Interchange and the Earl T. Shinhoster Bridge to honor him.

Footnotes

See also
 Dorothy Barnes Pelote
 Curtis Cooper
 Georgia General Assembly
 Ralph Mark Gilbert
 Savannah, Georgia
 W. W. Law

1950 births
2000 deaths
African-American Christians
American Pentecostals
Cleveland State University alumni
Members of the Church of God in Christ
Morehouse College alumni
NAACP activists
People from Savannah, Georgia